The 1906-06 French Rugby Union Championship was won by SBUC who beat Stade Français  in the final.

For the 4th time the final was between these teams and the fourth success of SBUC.

Quarts of final 
They was arranged by region. In the Seine region, Stade français beat Le Havre AC (13-0), in the Loire regions the US du Mans won with US Cognac (10-6).
In the Rhône region FC Lyon won for forfeit of the other teams and S.B.U.C. was the Garonne region champion winning with S.O.E.T. Toulouse (18-0).

Semifinals

Final 

 SBUC  : Louis Mulot, Alphonse Massé, Marc Giacardy, Jacques Duffourcq, Marcel Laffitte, Robert Blanchard, Herman Gross-Droz, Augustin Hourdebaigt, Jacques Gommes (cap), Henri Lacassagne, Maurice Leuvielle, Maurice Bruneau, Pascal Laporte, Hélier Thil, Henri Martin

Stade Français   : Pierre Rousseau, Marcel Communeau, Georges Jérome, Charles Beaurin, Francis Mouronval, Pierre Mouronval, Édouard Mirenowicz, Henri Marescal, Bernard Galichon, Alexandre Pharamond, Paul Sagot, Paul Maclos, Charles Vareilles, Julien Combe

External links
 Compte rendu de la finale de 1908, sur lnr.fr

Notes and references 

1907
France
Championship